Georissa filiasaulae is a species of a minute land snail that have an operculum, terrestrial gastropod mollusk in the family Hydrocenidae.

Distribution
This species lives in Sabah, Malaysian Borneo.

Ecology
It lives in caves.

References

External links

Hydrocenidae
Endemic fauna of Borneo
Gastropods of Asia
Gastropods described in 2007